Eungella is a rural town and locality in the Mackay Region, Queensland, Australia.

Geography 
The southern branch of Cattle Creek forms on this escarpment and creates the fertile valley to the east, where it becomes a tributary of the Pioneer River in Mirani, which eventually flows into the Coral Sea at Mackay.

The escarpment and several other parts of the locality are within the Eungella National Park, which extends into the neighbouring localities of Netherdale and Broken River and beyond. In the west and south of the locality are parts of the Crediton Forest Reserve which extends into the neighbouring localities of Crediton and Eungella Dam. There is also a section of the Crediton State Forest within the locality with another section in Crediton.

Due to the mountainous terrain and the protected areas, there is limited development of the land in the locality. Apart from residential use, the remaining land is used for grazing on native vegetation.

History 
The town takes its name from a pastoral run named by explorer and pioneer Ernest Favenc in July 1876. The name is believed to be an Aboriginal word meaning land of cloud.

The locality was within the proclaimed boundaries of the  Eungella Goldfield at the end of the 1800s and early 1900s. Access to the area was by a pack horse track or by a road via Nebo and Mount Britton. The Eungella Range Road opened in 1909. However damage had been incurred within twelve months, and repairs and a deviation instigated. In 1923 the first car traveled on the Eungella Range in wet slippery conditions, and resorted to tying a heavy sapling behind the car to steady the car. Landslips continue to be an issue following heavy rain.

Eungella Provisional School opened on circa 1891 but closed circa 1899.

On 31 January 1928, another Eungella Provisional School was opened and later became Eungella State School.

The Eungella Post Office was opened in 1930, but had to change its name due to another post office with the same name in New South Wales. After twelve months of community consultation the name Dalrymple Heights Post Office, after the nearby Mount Dalrymple, was found acceptable by the Postmaster General's Department.

Eungella was a cool retreat from the heat and humidity of the coast for picnic parties and tourists, and a venue for dances. Nineteen families from the region invested in a syndicate to build and operate the Eungella Chalet which was opened in 1933.

The foundation stone of the Eungella Presbyterian Church was laid in July 1947 and it was officially opened on 23 November 1947. The church was designed to be a replica of Reverend Maitland's father's church in Victoria. The church was damaged in March 2010 in Cyclone Ului and again in February 2011 in Cyclone Yasi. The church was demolished in April 2011.

Education 
Eungella State School is a government primary (Prep-6) school for boys and girls at 36 Eungella Dam Road. In 2018, the school had an enrolment of 38 students with 3 teachers (2 full-time equivalent) and 9 non-teaching staff (4 full-time equivalent).

There is no secondary school in Eungella. The nearest secondary school is Mirani State High School in Mirani to the east.

Amenities 
Eungella Memorial Hall is at 13 North Street. It is also known as the Eungella Hub and is managed by the Eungella District Community Association.

The Eungella Uniting Church is part of the Pioneer Valley Uniting Church. The Eungella congregation meet at the Eungella Memorial Hall.

Events 

The Eungella Markets are held on the first Sunday morning of every month at the Eungella Memorial Hall.

Attractions 
Eungella National Park is a popular attraction and is noted for rain forest walking trails and sightings of platypus. There are also a number of lookouts from the escarpment down the valley, including Goodes Lookout in the town and Sky Window lookout in the national park.

References

External links 
 

Mackay Region
Towns in Queensland
Localities in Queensland